An Extremely Goofy Movie is a 2000 animated comedy film distributed by Walt Disney Home Video, produced by Walt Disney Television Animation, and directed by Douglas McCarthy. It is a standalone sequel to the 1995 film A Goofy Movie and the finale to the television series Goof Troop, in which Max Goof goes to college and believes he will not have to deal with his father, Goofy, until he loses his job and enrolls there to receive the degree he never received years ago in order to get another one. Meanwhile, Max and his friends compete in the X Games, unaware of the reason why the school's top fraternity has a dynasty in the competition.

The film was released on Blu-ray as a Disney Movie Club exclusive alongside A Goofy Movie on April 23, 2019 and was one of the films to be included on the streaming service Disney+ upon its launch.

Plot
After Max Goof (who is now a high school graduate) goes to college with his friends P.J. and Bobby Zimuruski, his father, Goofy, begins to disastrously falter during his job at the local toy factory (because of his empty nest syndrome of missing Max), resulting in his dismissal following an accident he causes. At the unemployment office, Goofy is told that he needs a college degree to get another job since he did not finish college after his junior year in the 1970s. So Goofy goes back to college to finish his senior year of college to get another job.

Meanwhile, Max and his friends meet Bradley Uppercrust III, the leader of the Gamma Mu Mu fraternity and a veteran skateboarder. Bradley is impressed by Max's own skateboarding talent and invites him to join the Gammas and take part in the college's X Games. Max declines the offer due to the condition that he cannot bring his friends along. Following a skirmish, the two parties place a bet in which the loser becomes the other group's towel boy. To Max's horror, Goofy begins attending the same college and interrupts the group's down-time with chores. Max decides to distract his father by introducing him to the college librarian, Sylvia Marpole, with whom he has much in common. Goofy accidentally impresses Bradley with his clumsy attempt at skateboarding and is invited to join the Gammas, which he accepts upon Max's encouragement.

During the first qualifiers for the X Games, Bradley discreetly blinds Max with a pocket mirror during his performance and installs a rocket booster on Goofy's skateboard. Goofy beats Max and his team barely makes the semi-finals. Eventually, Max lashes out at Goofy, telling him to stay out of his life and storms off in anger. A depressed Goofy fails his first midterm exam and misses a date with Sylvia. Returning home, Goofy is inadvertently inspired by his neighbor, Pete to regain his focus. Goofy goes back to college and reconciles with Sylvia, who helps him ace the rest of his exams. As Goofy decides to quit the Gammas, he overhears the group plotting to cheat for the semi-finals, but Max, still angry with his father over beating him in the qualifiers, refuses to listen.

At the semi-finals, all teams but Max's and the Gammas' are eliminated. Just before the final triathlon, Bradley eliminates P.J. from the games, leaving Max's team short one player and spurring Max to recruit and apologize to Goofy for shunning him via the jumbotron. Throughout the race, Bradley and his team attempt to hinder Max's team, but fail. Although Goofy manages to temporarily knock out Bradley with a horseshoe in the final section of the race, his final trick results in his second-in-command, Tank, and Max getting trapped underneath the burning wreckage of a logo. As Bradley passes them by, Max and Goofy rescue Tank, who assists Max in winning the race. Afterwards, Bradley concedes his defeat as good sportsmanship and tells Max he will go through with their bet. However, Max calls off the bet, allowing a vengeful Tank to advance on Bradley for leaving him to die and fling him into the X Games blimp overhead. During graduation day, Max gives Goofy his grand prize trophy engraved with an affirmation of their bond to make amends for his outburst towards him as an apology gift just before Goofy (now free of his empty nest syndrome) drives off with Sylvia, restoring their relationship.

Voice cast
 Jason Marsden as Max Goof. Now 19-years-old and college-bound, his attempts to distance himself from Goofy wind up making things worse for him. By finally accepting Goofy as a major part of his life, he was able to find the independence he long sought. Bob Baxter and Steven Trenbirth served as the supervising animators for Max.
 Bill Farmer as Goofy. Goofy inconveniences the lives of those around him by accident, but always has the best intentions at heart. He spends most of the movie coming to terms with not being needed as a guardian for Max anymore. Andrew Collins served as the supervising animator for Goofy.
 Jeff Bennett as Bradley Uppercrust III, the leader of the Gamma Mu Mu fraternity and the main antagonist of the film. He is extremely arrogant and proud of his position as head of the fraternity and will do everything he can to keep it that way. Kevin Peaty served as the supervising animator for Bradley. 
 Bennett also voices the Unemployment Lady, Chuck the Sportscaster, Ken Clark (uncredited), a diminutive member of the Gammas (uncredited), and an X-Games referee (uncredited).
 Jim Cummings as Pete, P.J.'s father. Unlike Goofy, Pete is looking forward to rid himself of P.J. According to P.J., Pete intends to turn the latter's room into a bowling alley once he leaves for college.
 Cummings also voices Goofy's boss at his former job at the local toy factory (uncredited), a member of the Gammas who wears sunglasses (uncredited), and both a professor and a tour guide at the college (both uncredited).
 Vicki Lewis as the Beret Girl, a charismatic beatnik and suave stage performer in the college café called the "Bean Scene". She becomes P.J.'s love interest when the latter shows innate talent in poetry, and supports Max's group in general as they take on the Gammas. Kevin Peaty served as the supervising animator for the Beret Girl.
Bebe Neuwirth as Sylvia Marpole, the college librarian who immediately becomes Goofy's love interest when she is shown to share Goofy's love for American culture from the 1970s. Andrew Collins served as the supervising animator for Sylvia.
 Rob Paulsen as P.J. Max's best friend since childhood. Unlike Max, P.J. is somewhat woeful about how he never earned his dad's genuine respect but finds confidence after meeting with Beret Girl. Bob Baxter and Steven Trenbirth served as the supervising animators for P.J.
 Paulsen also voices a member of the Gammas with black hair and a big snout (uncredited), and an attendant at the X-Games semifinals (uncredited).
 Pauly Shore as Robert "Bobby" Zimuruski. Max's other best friend. Bob Baxter and Steven Trenbirth served as the supervising animators for Bobby.
 Brad Garrett as Tank, the second-in-command (later current leader) of the Gammas. Tank is big in stature, towering over the other characters, and serves as a typical muscle man for the Gammas.
Additional voices include Paddi Edwards as a receptionist (in her final film role) and Kath Soucie, Jenna von Oÿ (who voiced Stacey in the first film) and Cree Summer as college students.

Soundtrack
Unlike its predecessor, this film has no musical sequences where the characters sing on-screen. However, a number of songs are used in the soundtrack and have been included in the official album release which is titled Disney's An Extremely Goofy Movie Dance Party!, released in February 2000 alongside the film itself.
 "Future's So Bright I Gotta Wear Shades" – Pat Benatar and Neil Giraldo
 "Don't Give Up" – John Avila, Terrence A. Carson, Carmen Carter and Carl Graves
 "Nowhere to Run" – John Avila
 "Pressure Drop" – The Specials
 "Shake Your Groove Thing" – Peaches & Herb
 "You Make Me Feel Like Dancing" – Carmen Carter and Donnie McClurkin
 ESPN X Games Theme 1 and Theme 2
 "C'mon Get Happy!" – The Partridge Family
 "Knock on Wood" – Carmen Carter
 ESPN X Games Theme 3
 "Right Back Where We Started From" – Cleopatra

Promotion

A number of McDonald's Happy Meal toys based on the film were produced and released for the month of February 2000.

Reception 
The film was released on February 29, 2000 to positive reviews from critics, who called it "likable," "fun," "funny," "ambitious and surprisingly good," and Goofy's character in the film "limber and funny as ever." Rotten Tomatoes gives the film a 63% approval rating with an average rating of 5.4/10, based on eight reviews, making it one of the few Disney sequels to be rated higher than its predecessor. The Houston Chronicles Bruce Westbrook praised its "fluid" animation, "handsomely detailed" backgrounds, and the "charming" sequences with the Beret Girl. Randy Myers of the Contra Costa Times complimented its positive take on the father-and-son relationship trope as "refreshing" compared to other films painting it in a negative manner. Many touches were positively noted, such as the elements of 1970s' culture, the soundtrack (particularly its 1970s tracks and the newly-recorded covers), movie parodies (such as The Gooffather, The Goofinator and Pup Fiction Too), and a line making fun of characters "always wearing gloves" in the Disney universe. Subplots such the skateboard competition and the "sweet" relationship between Goofy and Sylvia were highlighted as well.

An Extremely Goofy Movies less favorable reviews categorized the film as a weaker version of Rodney Dangerfield's Back to School. and the Los Angeles Times Susan King who wrote that despite "some funny lines and scenes," it had too little emotionally due to a lack of character development for Goofy. Michael Scheinfeld of Common Sense Media praised the film's morals of "the importance of education, of not cheating, and staying focused on one's goals," but disliked its attempts to be hip and the "less-than-exemplary character traits" that paint an inaccurate picture of college students. Barbara Bova of Naples Daily News also dismissed the film for the immature behavior of the college students as well as the dysfunctional relationship between Max and Goofy and a "depressing," humorless plot where "the adults are no smarter than the kids" and "Goofy is the essential innocent who is stupid with a capital S." Scheinfeld also called the animation "less sophisticated than Disney's theatrical films, but features some amusing and stylish touches, such as a psychedelic dream sequence in the style of Yellow Submarine, and a school dance that Goofy turns into a disco inferno."

Petrana Radulovic of Polygon, in 2019, ranked An Extremely Goofy Movie the sixth best Disney sequel, labeling it as "all delightfully bonkers" and claiming its best aspects to be the Beret Girl and Bobby's poke on Disney characters wearing gloves; she also, however, criticized some of its content as "stuck in a gnarly late-’90s vortex."

An Extremely Goofy Movie won the award for "Best Animated Home Video Production" and Bill Farmer was nominated for "Best Voice Acting by a Male Performer" at the 28th Annie Awards in 2000.

Censorship
Following the September 11 attacks in 2001, the scene in which Goofy rescues Max and Tank from under the burning X Games logo structure was removed from television broadcasts of the film; the scene remains in all other versions of the movie, but the broadcast version skips this scene entirely to show them skating out of the wreckage.

References

External links

 
 
 
 

2000 animated films
2000 films
2000 direct-to-video films
2000s American animated films
2000s buddy comedy films
2000s children's animated films
2000 comedy films
2000s coming-of-age comedy films
2000 directorial debut films
2000s English-language films
American buddy comedy films
American children's animated comedy films
American coming-of-age comedy films
American sequel films
American television series finales
Animated buddy films
Animated coming-of-age films
Animated teen films
Animated films about dogs
Animated films based on animated series
Australian animated feature films
Australian comedy films
Direct-to-video comedy films
Direct-to-video sequel films
Disney direct-to-video animated films
DisneyToon Studios animated films
Disney Television Animation films
Films about dysfunctional families
Films about fraternities and sororities
Films about father–son relationships
Films about librarians
Films scored by Steve Bartek
Films set in the United States
Films set in universities and colleges
Goof Troop
Goofy (Disney) films
Midlife crisis films
Skateboarding films